This is a list of Russian football transfers in the summer transfer window 2013 by club. Only clubs of the 2013–14 Russian Premier League are included.

Russian Premier League 2013–14

Amkar Perm

In:

Out:

Anzhi Makhachkala

In:

Out:

CSKA Moscow

In:

Out:

Dynamo Moscow

In:

Out:

Krasnodar

In:

Out:

Krylia Sovetov Samara

In:

Out:

Kuban Krasnodar

In:

Out:

Lokomotiv Moscow

In:

Out:

Rostov

In:

Out:

Rubin Kazan

In:

Out:

Spartak Moscow

In:

Out:

Terek Grozny

In:

Out:

Tom Tomsk

In:

Out:

Ural Sverdlovsk Oblast

In:

Out:

Volga Nizhny Novgorod

In:

Out:

Zenit Saint Petersburg

In:

Out:

References

Transfers
2013
Russia